Pabna Zilla School is the oldest high school in the Pabna District of Bangladesh. It provides education from class Three to Ten. It has two shifts - morning and day. The morning shift starts at 7:15 am and ends at 11.45am. And the day shift starts at 12:30 pm and ends at 5:15 pm. This only applies from class 6 to 10. From class 3 to 5 time slot is lesser than above for both shifts. Each shift has a 20 minutes tiffin break after the 3rd period.

Though it is a boys' school, it has male and female teachers. The school has one headmaster and two assistant headmaster. It has separate groups of teachers for morning and day shift. The school has a playground, three buildings (the Administrative Building, the Academic Building, and the Science Building), one hall room, a hostel and a mosque. There is a library in ground floor of hostel with 2000+ books & a librarian. Students can borrow books and read books. It has a computer laboratory, two permanent multimedia class rooms and three individual laboratories for physics, chemistry and biology. This school has a big ground where students do their assembly and participate in various sports at tiffin period and after school. Even there are individual sports classes for each section ones in a week. There are two cycle garage (one is beside the hostel, and other is beside the academic building). There is a Shaheed Minar on one side of the playground.

History 
Pabna Zilla School was established as an Anglo-Vernacular type of school named Hardinge School between 1836-1840. The founder of the school was Babu Digombor Saha and he was assisted by Babu RadhaGobinda Mitra. Babu Ramchandra Nandi was the headmaster during the period 1844–1853. On 1 November 1853 the school became a government Public school (government funded) and was named Pabna Zilla School. In 1966-1967 the number of students were 717.

On behalf of the National Mohammedan Association, the opening assembly of Pabna Zilla School's Muslim Boarding Hall was held on 11 January 1899. Abul Mahmud, the erstwhile Deputy Magistrate of Pabna, gave a speech. The construction of that student hall was primarily funded by the three brother Zamindars of Dulai (Husayn Jan Chowdhury, Fasiluddin Abdul Ghani Chowdhury and Abdul Basit Chowdhury), the Nawab of Dhaka Khwaja Ahsanullah and the Nawab of Dhanbari Syed Nawab Ali Chowdhury. At that time, the branch's assistant editor was Alimuddin.

Uniform
Morning Shift: White shirts with Red shoulder mark and Khaki pants. A Red background school badge has to be stitched on the shirt pocket.

Day Shift: White shirts with Navy blue shoulder mark and khaki pants. A Navy blue background school badge has to be stitched on the shirt pocket.

Note: All students have to wear white socks and shoes and they also have to hang their id card given by the school around their neck. A V-neck sweater can be worn during winter.

Location 
Pabna Zilla School is located in the center of Pabna at A. Hamid Road, opposite Pabna District Jail.

Admission 
It is a Bengali medium school. Admission is arranged in class three once a year. Admission into the school is competitive. After an initial screening, more than 5000 applicants are offered to appear in an admission test for 240 seats only. Coaching centers are also been established in Pabna for the preparation of the admission test.

Notable alumni 
 Fazle Hasan Abed, social worker
 Kazi Zainul Abedin, poet
 Shamim Ahmed Alpha, NASA scientist
 Jagadish Chandra Bose, scientist
 Shamsur Rahman Sharif Dilu, land minister
 Gopal Chandra Lahiri, educationalist
 Bande Ali Mia, poet
 Mohammed Fazle Rabbee, cardiologist and intellectual martyr 
 Abdullah Abu Sayeed, writer, television presenter, activist
 Abu Hena Mustafa Kamal, poet

See also

List of Zilla Schools of Bangladesh

References

High schools in Bangladesh
1853 establishments in India
Educational institutions established in 1853
Schools in Pabna District
Boys' schools in Bangladesh